is a subway station in Bunkyo, Tokyo, Japan, operated by Toei Subway. It is located next to Kōrakuen Station on the Tokyo Metro Marunouchi Line and Tokyo Metro Namboku Line. It is built under the Bunkyo City Office building.

Lines
Kasuga Station is served by the following two lines.
 Toei Mita Line (I-12)
 Toei Oedo Line (E-07)

Station layout
Kasuga station has nine exits.

Platforms

History
The station first opened on 30 June 1971, served by the Toei Mita Line. The Toei Oedo Line station opened on 12 December 2000.

Surrounding area 
Kōrakuen Station

See also
 List of railway stations in Japan

References

External links

 Toei Mita Line station information 
 Toei Oedo Line station information 

Railway stations in Tokyo
Railway stations in Japan opened in 1972
Toei Mita Line
Toei Ōedo Line